Endopappus is a genus of flowering plants in the daisy family described as a genus in 1860.

There is only one known species, Endopappus macrocarpus, native to North Africa (Morocco, Algeria, Tunisia, Libya).

subspecies
 Endopappus macrocarpus subsp. macrocarpus - Morocco, Algeria, Tunisia, Libya
 Endopappus macrocarpus subsp. maroccanus (Jahand., Maire & Weiller) Ibn Tattou - Morocco

References

Anthemideae
Monotypic Asteraceae genera
Flora of North Africa